Gry Molvær Hivju (born 16 October 1970) is a Norwegian journalist, director, producer and screenwriter. She was employed by NRK (Norwegian Broadcasting Corporation) from 1994 to 2014. As a member of NRK, she worked as a program manager in the popular science program Schrödingers katt and in NRK News.

Biography 
Hivju has a media education from Volda University College, as well as an extension of political science and international politics. In 2012, she was in the first litter of NRK's major investment "MasterClass" for selected directing and producer talents. She also has additional education in fine arts from Einar Granum Art School, and also had several art photo exhibitions. In addition, she has had the scenography of major performances, such as "From Hat to Hope" in Nidaros Cathedral.

Hivju has received the Kringkastingsprisen, Folkeopplysningsprisen and multiple language prizes. Her latest documentary, Bit Ballerina Bulldog, which is about the art of Karen Bit Vejle, was nominated for "Best Documentary of the Year" during the Bergen International Film Festival (BIFF) in 2015. The documentary was later nominated for "Best Movie Music" under Gullruten. Hivju also participated as one of the artists in the film Lysleite, which won the Professional Award "Best Photo" during the Gold Route in 2014. The film is produced by Tindefilm, in which Hivju is a part owner. 

Hivju was juror for the Ministry of Culture New Norwegian Prize for journalists for eight years, and she was a member of the project group for the NRK Nynorsk Media Center. She has otherwise led many major debates and events, including the Oslo Philharmonic,  Awards, and the Royal Norwegian Society of Sciences and Letters.

Over the years, Hivju has provided commentary on a number of nature and science documentaries at NRK, including Continental Growing Up (NRK / BBC), Animal Super Senses (NRK / BBC) and Haiane's enigmatic life (NRK / BBC). She has also been used as a script consultant on various productions and for the Amanda Award-nominated documentary The Silver of the Sea, as well as writing texts for the artist Ørnulf Opdahl's book Over the Atlantic Ridge (Deeper Than Light).

In 2017, Hivju directed Harnessing the Wind, a commercial film about wind power for the company Aker Solutions. In 2018 and 2019, Hivju was an associate producer for Nordisk Film and NRK's drama series TWIN.

Documentaries 
Hivju has participated in the following documentary film projects as director, screenwriter and / or commentator:

 Pilot om Ole Brude, 2018 
 Bankskøyta, 2016 
 Bit Ballerina Bulldog, 2015  
 Herdalshuldra, 2013
 Rundeskatten, 2011 
 Havlandet, 2006 
 Lys født i mørke (short film), 1998 
 Ungkarar i Sande (short film), 1997

Personal life 
Hivju is from the island of Sula på Sunnmøre. She is married to Kristofer Hivju. Together they have two daughters, Noor (born in 2008) and Sylja (born in 2009).

References

People from Møre og Romsdal
Norwegian journalists
Norwegian photographers
NRK people
1970 births
Living people